The Sun Fast 37 is a French sailboat that was designed by Jacques Fauroux as a racer-cruiser and first built in 2000.

The design is a more racing-oriented development of Fauroux's 1998 Sun Odyssey 37, with a taller rig and a deeper keel.

Production
The design was built by Jeanneau in France, starting in 2000, but it is now out of production.

Design
The Sun Fast 37 is a recreational keelboat, built predominantly of fiberglass, with wood trim. It has a fractional sloop rig, a raked stem, a reverse transom an internally mounted spade-type rudder controlled by a wheel and a fixed fin keel with a weighted bulb. It displaces  and carries  of ballast.

The design has sleeping accommodation for six people in three cabins, with a double "V"-berth in the bow cabin, a "U"-shaped settee and a straight settee in the main cabin and two aft cabin, each with a double berth. A two cabin interior has just one larger aft cabin on the port side. The galley is located on the port side just forward of the companionway ladder. The galley is "L"-shaped and is equipped with a two-burner stove, an ice box and a double sink. A navigation station is opposite the galley, on the starboard side. The head is located aft on the starboard side. On the two cabin layout the head is larger and includes a shower.

Operational history
The boat was at one time supported by a class club that organized racing events, the Sun Fast Association.

In a 2015 review for Boats.com, Rupert Holmes wrote, "this Jacques Fauroux designed 37-footer helped to set new standards in accommodation in cruising boats of this size when it was first launched at the very end of the 1990s. In addition, it also provided reasonable sailing performance, especially in the Sun Fast version, which offered a deep bulb keel with a draught of 2.07m allied to a larger rig. As a result both models proved popular, with production continuing for some seven years."

See also
List of sailing boat types

References

External links

Keelboats
2000s sailboat type designs
Sailing yachts
Sailboat type designs by Jacques Fauroux
Sailboat types built by Jeanneau